Interleukin-15 receptor is a type I cytokine receptor, binding interleukin-15. It consists of an interleukin 15 receptor, alpha subunit and shares common beta and gamma subunits with the IL-2 receptor.

References

External links
 

Type I cytokine receptors